IF Warta is a Swedish football club located in Hisingen, Göteborg.

Background
Idrottsföreningen Warta, a football club from Hisingen in Gothenburg, was founded in 1929. The name Warta is said to be named after a rusty old boat that was moored at Sannegårdshamnen, Lindholmen (in Gothenburg), at the time when the club was founded. The club's most famous player is Glenn Hysén who began his career with IF Warta as a youngster.

Since their foundation IF Warta has participated mainly in the middle divisions of the Swedish football league system.  The club currently plays in Division 3 Nordvästra Götaland which is the fifth tier of Swedish football. The club spent 4 seasons in Division 2, then the third tier of Swedish football, in 1987 and from 1989 to 1991. They play their home matches at the Sälöfjordsplan in Göteborg.

IF Warta are affiliated to Göteborgs Fotbollförbund.

Recent history
In recent seasons IF Warta have competed in the following divisions:

2021 – Division V, Göteborg B
2020 – Division V, Göteborg B
2019 – Division V, Göteborg B
2018 – Division V, Göteborg B
2017 – Division VI, Göteborg D
2016 – Division VI, Göteborg D
2015 – Division V, Göteborg A
2014 – Division IV, Göteborg A
2013 – Division IV, Göteborg A
2012 – Division IV, Göteborg A
2011 – Division III, Nordvästra Götaland
2010 – Division III, Nordvästra Götaland
2009 – Division III, Nordvästra Götaland
2008 – Division III, Nordvästra Götaland
2007 – Division IV, Göteborg B
2006 – Division IV, Göteborg B
2005 – Division IV, Göteborg B
2004 – Division IV, Göteborg B
2003 – Division IV, Göteborg B
2002 – Division IV, Göteborg B
2001 – Division IV, Göteborg B
2000 – Division IV, Göteborg B
1999 – Division IV, Göteborg B
1998 – Division IV, Göteborg B
1997 – Division IV, Göteborg B
1996 – Division IV, Göteborg B
1995 – Division IV, Göteborg B
1994 – Division IV, Göteborg B
1993 – Division IV, Göteborg B

Attendances

In recent seasons IF Warta have had the following average attendances:

Footnotes

External links
 IF Warta – Official website

Football clubs in Gothenburg
Association football clubs established in 1929
Hisingen
1929 establishments in Sweden
Football clubs in Västra Götaland County